Procambarus angustatus was a species of crayfish in the family Cambaridae. It was only known from the type specimen, described by John Lawrence LeConte in 1856. He reported that it "lives in lesser Georgia, in the rivulets of pure water which flow between little sand hills". It was endemic to the U. S. state of Georgia, but is now believed to be extinct.

References

Cambaridae
Extinct animals of the United States
Freshwater crustaceans of North America
Crustaceans described in 1856
Extinct invertebrates since 1500
Extinct crustaceans
Taxonomy articles created by Polbot
Species known from a single specimen
Taxa named by John Lawrence LeConte